= Setdar Setdarov =

1. REDIRECT Draft:Setdar Setdarov
